Johan Pettersson may refer to:

 Johan Pettersson (athlete) (1884–1952), Finnish Olympic track and field athlete
 Johan Pettersson (footballer, born 1980), Swedish footballer
 Johan Pettersson (footballer, born 1989), Dutch-born Swedish footballer

See also
 Johan Petersson (disambiguation)